The city flag of Portland, Oregon, consists of a green field on which is placed a white four-pointed star (a truncated hypocycloid) from which radiate blue stripes, each bordered by L-shaped yellow elements. Narrow white fimbriations separate the blue and yellow elements from each other and from the green background. The official ordinance specifies a height of 3 feet and a length of 5 feet.

Design and history
City ordinance 176874, adopted September 4, 2002, designates the design and its symbolism. Green stands for "the forests and our green City"; yellow for "agriculture and commerce"; blue for "our rivers". Portland straddles the Willamette River near its confluence with the Columbia River. City Ordinance 186794, adopted September 3, 2014, updated the proportions and the Pantone color specifications: White, PMS 279 (Blue); PMS 349 (Green); and PMS 1235 (Yellow).

The flag was designed in 1969 by a longtime Portland resident, noted graphic designer R. Douglas Lynch (1913–2009). That version of the flag was adopted in January 1970 and at that time included, over Lynch's objections, a dark blue canton containing the city seal in yellow and white; in 2002 Lynch and fellow members of the Portland Flag Association persuaded the Portland City Council to simplify the design to better reflect his original intent.

The flag's design ranked seventh among the flags of 150 US cities in the North American Vexillological Association's "American City Flag Survey of 2004".

Gallery

See also
 Flag of Oregon
 Seal of Portland, Oregon

References

Further reading

External links
 City Flag general description and legal specification (from City Auditor's website)
 
 99% Invisible podcast, Episode 140: Vexillonaire – Tells the story of the 1969 & 2002 Portland flags
 website of the Portland Flag Association

Flag
Flags of cities in Oregon
Flags introduced in 1969
1969 establishments in Oregon